For the Kids is the second Extended Play (or "Six Pak," as referred to on the album cover) by American country music artist John Rich, one half of the duo Big & Rich. Rich contributed to the writing of three of the six total tracks.  The EP was released on May 17, 2011, coinciding with the release of John Rich's other EP, Rich Rocks.  Reprise Records released both For the Kids and Rich Rocks.  The songs "She's a Butterfly" and "Rescue Me" were originally recorded by Rich for his 2001 solo album Rescue Me.

Track listing

Personnel
 Steve Brewster - drums
 Dennis Burnside - keyboards
 Shannon Forrest - drums
 Larry Franklin - fiddle, mandolin
 Owen Hale - drums
 Mike Johnson - steel guitar
 Doug Kahan - bass guitar
 Brent Mason - electric guitar
 Greg Morrow - drums
 Duncan Mullins - bass guitar
 Matt Pierson - bass guitar
 John Rich - acoustic guitar, lead vocals, background vocals
 Jeff Roach - keyboards
 Mike Rojas - keyboards 
 Adam Shoenfeld - electric guitar
 Joe Spivey - fiddle
 Bobby Terry - acoustic guitar
 Ilya Toshinsky - acoustic guitar
 Sharon Vaughn - background vocals
 Glenn Worf - bass guitar
 Jonathan Yudkin - strings

Chart performance

References

2011 EPs
John Rich EPs
Warner Records EPs
Albums produced by John Rich